Querfurt is a town in the Saalekreis district, or Kreis, in southern Saxony-Anhalt, Germany. In 2020, the town had a population of 10,454. The town Querfurt consists of Querfurt proper and the following 8 Ortschaften or municipal divisions: Gatterstädt, Grockstädt, Leimbach, Lodersleben, Schmon, Vitzenburg, Weißenschirmbach and Ziegelroda.

Querfurt is known as the birthplace of Saint Bruno of Querfurt.

History
The ruling family having become extinct in 1496, it passed to that of Mansfeld. In 1635, according to the terms of the Peace of Prague, it was ceded to the Elector of Saxony, John George I, who handed it over to his son Augustus of Saxe-Weissenfels; in 1746, it was united once more with Saxony. It was incorporated into Prussia in 1815.

Notable people

 Jacob Christian Schäffer (1718-1790), a Protestant minister, naturalist, pioneer of the washing machine and the wood paper
 Georg Muche (1895-1987), Bauhaus artist, painter and graphic artist
 Walter Herrmann (1910-1987), physicist
 Ulrich Willerding (born 1932), botanist
 Dietmar Demuth (born 1955), football player and coach
 Jan Seyffarth (born 1986), racing driver

Other personalities associated with the town
 Johann Gottfried Schnabel (born 1692, died between 1751 and 1758), German writer; settled down in 1719 as a barber in Querfurt.
 Julius von Kirchmann (1802-1884), lawyer and politician, law court official in Querfurt

 Hans Schomburgk (1880-1967), explorer and pioneer of German wildlife films

Gallery

References

External links 
Official Website of the City of Querfurt

Saalekreis